In the mathematical areas of linear algebra and representation theory, a problem is wild if it contains the problem of classifying pairs of square matrices up to simultaneous similarity. Examples of wild problems are classifying indecomposable representations of any quiver that is neither a Dynkin quiver (i.e. the underlying undirected graph of the quiver is a (finite) Dynkin diagram) nor a Euclidean quiver (i.e., the underlying undirected graph of the quiver is an affine Dynkin diagram).

Necessary and sufficient conditions have been proposed to check the simultaneously block triangularization and diagonalization of a finite set of matrices under the assumption that each matrix is diagonalizable over the field of the complex numbers.

References  

Linear algebra
Representation theory